The Archdeacon of Bromley & Bexley is a senior ecclesiastical officer in charge of the Bromley & Bexley archdeaconry in the Church of England Diocese of Rochester. The archdeaconry was created — as the Archdeaconry of Bromley, from the Archdeaconry of Rochester — by Order in Council on 4 January 1955.

List of archdeacons
1955–1966 (d.): Reginald McCahearty
1966–1968 (res.): David Halsey
1968–1969 (res.): David Stewart-Smith
1969–1978 (ret.): Herbert Cragg (afterwards archdeacons emeritus)
1979–1994 (ret.): Edward Francis (afterwards archdeacons emeritus)
1994–2003 (ret.): Garth Norman (afterwards archdeacons emeritus)
The archdeaconry was renamed to Bromley & Bexley at the beginning of 2002.
2003–2022 (ret.): Paul Wright
"late April" 2023 onwards: Allie Kerr (announced)

References

Anglican ecclesiastical offices
Lists of Anglicans
Lists of English people
London religion-related lists
Archdeacons of Bromley